Transferred intent (or transferred , or transferred malice, in English law) is a legal doctrine that holds that, when the intention to harm one individual inadvertently causes a second person to be hurt instead, the perpetrator is still held responsible. To be held legally responsible, a court typically must demonstrate that the perpetrator had criminal intent, that is, that they knew or should have known that another would be harmed by their actions and wanted this harm to occur. For example, if a murderer intends to kill John, but accidentally kills George instead, the intent is transferred from John to George, and the killer is held to have had criminal intent.

Transferred intent also applies to tort law, in which there are generally five areas where transferred intent is applicable: battery, assault, false imprisonment, trespass to land, and trespass to chattels.  Generally, any intent to cause any one of these five torts which results in the completion of any of the five tortious acts will be considered an intentional act, even if the actual target of the tort is one other than the intended target of the original tort.

See cases of Carnes v. Thompson, 48 S.W.2d 903 (Mo. 1932) and Bunyan v. Jordan (1937), 57 C.L.R. 1, 37 S.R.N.S.W. 119 for examples.

Discussion

In the United States 
In US criminal law, transferred intent is sometimes explained by stating that "the intent follows the bullet". That is, the intent to kill person A by gunshot would still apply even if the bullet kills an unintended victim, person B (see mens rea). Thus, the intent is transferred between victims.  However, intent only transfers between harms of a similar nature. For example, if the defendant shoots at "Person A" intending to kill "A" but the bullet misses and instead hits a vase, causing it to break, the defendant is not deemed to have intended to break the vase. This is because destruction of property is a kind of harm different from that contemplated by defendant. Vice versa, an attempt to wreck a car, but causing instead a person to be hurt or killed, can only be sentenced for recklessly causing death, i.e. involuntary manslaughter. The rationale underlying this distinction is that the defendant has only one intent. If the law were to deem that the defendant intended to destroy property, it would be placing on him an intent he never had—he would now have both the intent to kill and the intent to destroy property. In contrast, where the defendant intends to kill one person but ends up killing another, there is still only one intent — the intent to kill. However, if the crime includes aggravating factors based on the victim's identity (such as a police officer, witness, or protected class), then the factors must be proven to have actually occurred in order to impose an enhanced sentence. For instance, if the defendant intends to kill a police officer in a jurisdiction where that is punishable by death, but instead kills a civilian, the death penalty may not be imposed unless there was another aggravating factor that actually occurred.

The principle underlying the Unborn Victims of Violence Act of 2004 in the United States applies only to offenses over which the U.S. government has jurisdiction, namely crimes committed on federal properties, against certain federal officials and employees, and by members of the military, but treats the fetus as a separate person for the purposes of all levels of assault including murder and attempted murder:

In the United Kingdom 
In the UK the transferred malice doctrine is not without controversy. The House of Lords in Attorney General's Reference  No  3  of  1994 reversed the Court of Appeal decision (reported at (1996) 2 WLR 412), holding that the doctrine of transferred malice could not apply to convict an accused of murder when the defendant had stabbed a pregnant woman in the face, back and abdomen. Some days after she was released from hospital in an apparently stable condition, she went into labour and gave birth to a premature child, who died four months later. The child had been wounded in the original attack but the more substantial cause of death was her prematurity. It was argued that the fetus was part of the mother so that any intention to cause grievous bodily harm (GBH) to the mother was also an intent aimed at the fetus. Lord Mustill criticised the doctrine as having no sound intellectual basis, saying that it was related to the original concept of malice, i.e. that a wrongful act displayed a malevolence which could be attached to any adverse consequence, and this had long been out of date. Nevertheless, it would sometimes provide a justification to convict when that was a common sense outcome and so could sensibly be retained. The present case was not a simple "transfer" from mother to uterine child, but sought to create an intention to cause injury to the child after birth. This would be a double transfer: first from the mother to the fetus, and then from the fetus to the child when it was born. Then one would have to apply the fiction which converts an intention to commit GBH into the mens rea of murder. That was too much. But the accused could be convicted of manslaughter.

In R v Gnango, the Supreme Court controversially held that under the doctrines of joint enterprise and transferred malice D2 is guilty of V's murder if D1 and D2 voluntarily engage in fighting each other, each intending to kill or cause grievous bodily harm to the other and each foreseeing that the other has the reciprocal intention, and if D1 mistakenly kills V in the course of the fight.

References

Dillof, Transferred Intent: An Inquiry into the Nature of Criminal Culpability, (1998) Vol 1, Buffalo Criminal Law Review, 501.
Husak, Transferred Intent, (1996) Vol. 10 Notre Dame Journal of Law, Ethics and Public Policy, 65.

Tort law
Criminal law
Intention